Inape semuncus is a species of moth of the family Tortricidae and is endemic to Peru.

References

Moths described in 1997
Endemic fauna of Peru
Moths of South America
semuncus
Taxa named by Józef Razowski